John Feaver (born 16 February 1952) is a former professional tennis player from the United Kingdom.

Career
After attending Millfield, Feaver enjoyed most of his tennis success while playing doubles.  During his career he reached 10 doubles finals, achieved a career-high singles ranking of World No. 98 in October 1973, and a career-high doubles ranking of 104 in January 1983. He was a French Open doubles semi-finalist in 1982. 
For over 20 years (1976 to 1997), Feaver held the record for serving the most aces in a single Wimbledon match, 42, achieved against John Newcombe. He also represented Great Britain in the Davis Cup between 1977 and 1983. He also achieved the remarkable distinction of beating five-times Wimbledon champion Bjorn Borg twice in a week at the Beckenham grass court tournament in the mid-1970s.
John has enjoyed a successful career in sport and business after his tennis days and lives between Wimbledon and Somerset.

Personal life
He married South African Alison Braatvedt and has two children Lucinda and James, who is also a tennis player.  John is an accomplished golfer and cricketer and works closely with sports charities StreetGames and Performance Plus Sport.

Grand Prix and WCT finals

Doubles (1 win, 9 losses)

References

External links
 
 

English male tennis players
People from Fleet, Hampshire
British male tennis players
1952 births
Living people
Tennis people from Hampshire